Robert Alan Deal (born May 4, 1951), known professionally as Mick Mars, is an American musician and the lead guitarist and co-founder of the heavy metal band Mötley Crüe. He is known for his aggressive, melodic solos and bluesy riffs.

Career 

Mars was born in Terre Haute, Indiana, but his family moved to Huntington, Indiana, soon afterward. Before he was nine years old, his family relocated again, this time to Garden Grove, California. He dropped out of high school and began playing guitar in a series of unsuccessful blues-based rock bands throughout the 1970s, sometimes using the name Zorky Charlemagne, and occasionally taking on menial day jobs. One of the bands, Whitehorse, had a vocalist named Micki Marz who inspired the later name change.  The name Mötley Crüe came about after Mars remembered someone referring to an old band he was in as a "motley looking crew."

After nearly a decade of frustration with the California music scene, he reinvented himself, changing his name from Robert Deal to Mick Mars and dyeing his hair jet black, hoping for a fresh start. In April 1980 he put a want ad in the Los Angeles newspaper The Recycler, describing himself as "a loud, rude and aggressive guitar player". Nikki Sixx and Tommy Lee, who were putting together a new band which would soon become Mötley Crüe, contacted him, and hired him after hearing him play. Mars has been the guitarist for Mötley Crüe since. In 2015, he played with the band on what was reported at the time to be its final tour. Soon after it was announced he was working on a solo album with former Mötley Crüe member John Corabi.

Mars has contributed songwriting to John LeCompt, a former member of Evanescence and the other band members of Machina, and to the Swedish band Crashdïet. Their second album, The Unattractive Revolution, was released on October 3, 2007, and featured two songs co-written by Mars.

Mars played guitar on the title track of Hinder's 2008 album Take It to the Limit, and contributed a guitar solo to the song "Into the Light" by Papa Roach, on their 2009 album Metamorphosis. Mars also contributed a guitar solo to the song "The Question" on Rock Star: Supernova runner-up Dilana's U.S. debut album Inside Out. In 2010 he co-wrote a song with Escape the Fate for the band's self-titled album, which was instead withheld from the album and reserved for a later release. Mars co-wrote and appears in the music video of the song "Boss's Daughter" by Pop Evil on their 2011 album War of Angels.

In November 2019, Mars released a new song, "The Way I'm Wired", with Black Smoke Trigger. Mars was also featured on the hit single "Outlaws & Outsiders" by Cory Marks.

Mötley Crüe reunited in 2018 and started touring again in 2022. On October 26, 2022, Mars announced his retirement from touring with Mötley Crüe. The next day, the band confirmed that John 5 had taken his place. That same week, they announced Mars' complete retirement from the band, supporting his decision, with John 5 taking his place starting with the 2023's The World Tour with Def Leppard.

Health 
For most of his professional career, Mars has openly struggled with ankylosing spondylitis, a chronic, inflammatory form of arthritis that mainly affects the spine and pelvis. It was initially diagnosed when he was 17 years old and has increasingly impaired his movement and has caused him pain. This led to hip-replacement surgery at the end of 2004.

Over the years, the illness has caused his lower spine to seize up and freeze completely solid, "... causing scoliosis in [his] back and squashing [him] further down and forward until [he] was a full  shorter than [he] was in high school." Mars reported in 2013 that his neck is so stiff he could not even turn his head, preventing him from driving a car.

Equipment 
Mars in his early career used guitars that were popular at the time: Kramer, and other Superstrats; on occasion he used a black Gibson Les Paul, and sometimes a B.C. Rich. However, according to an interview published in September 2009, Mars' main stage guitars for that tour were Fender Stratocasters with an "HSH" (humbucker, single coil, humbucker) configuration. He frequently used a Stratocaster modified from components of 1963, 1964, and 1965 models with J.M. Rolph pickups and a licensed Floyd Rose bridge system turning it into a Superstrat.

References

External links 

20th-century American musicians
21st-century American musicians
American heavy metal guitarists
Glam metal musicians
Lead guitarists
Living people
Mötley Crüe members
People from Terre Haute, Indiana
People from Garden Grove, California
Year of birth uncertain
Guitarists from Indiana
Singers from Indiana
1951 births